Karrar is a given name. Notable people with this name include the following:

Karrar Hussain (1911–1999), Pakistani educationist, writer and literary critic
Karrar Jassim (born 1987), Iraqi footballer
Karrar Mohammed (born 1989), Iraqi footballer
Karrar Nabeel (born 1998), Iraqi footballer

See also

Karra
Kardar (disambiguation)
Karrar (disambiguation)

Masculine given names